Alexander Mason Marlow (born January 24, 1986) an American media executive who is currently the editor-in-chief of Breitbart News. Marlow began his career as Andrew Breitbart's editorial assistant, a position which he held for four years. He was hired in 2008 as Breitbart's inaugural managing editor and served as its first employee. Marlow hosts Breitbart News Daily on SiriusXM. He was named to the Forbes 30 Under 30 list for 2015.

Background 
Marlow was born January 24, 1986. His father is Catholic and his mother is Jewish. For high school, he attended Harvard-Westlake School. While a student there, he befriended Andrew Breitbart, who hired him as the first employee at Breitbart News to do odd jobs and minor copy editing. He says that at the time his job was mostly being a "glorified personal assistant" to Breitbart, which subsequently developed into an editorial position as the site became more successful.

Editor of Breitbart
As Editor-in-Chief of Breitbart, Marlow has indicated the key narratives for the website include immigration, the Islamic State, race riots, traditional values, and Hillary Clinton. Marlow has stated Brietbart is not intended to influence, but to report and highlight stories that conservatives consider important, particularly those involving trade, spending, and immigration.

It has been reported that some former Breitbart employees believe Marlow privately harbors misgivings with the sites direction, with one suggesting Marlow was the "good cop to the bad cop played by Steve Bannon."

Marlow has denied that Breitbart is a "hate-site", insisting "[t]here's no racism; there's no bigotry. It's about values; it's about fairness." He has also denied allegations of antisemitism, telling NBC News "that we're consistently called anti-Semitic despite the fact that we are overwhelmingly staffed with Jews and are pro-Israel and pro-Jewish. That is fake news."

References

External links 

 

Living people
1986 births
American male journalists
Journalists from California
Harvard-Westlake School alumni
University of California, Berkeley alumni
Breitbart News people
People from Los Angeles
20th-century American Jews
21st-century American Jews